Wenderson de Arruda Said (born 17 April 1975), commonly known as Wender, is a Brazilian retired footballer who played as a forward, currently a manager.

He spent the vast majority of his professional career in Portugal, amassing Primeira Liga totals of 190 matches and 41 goals over seven seasons and representing in the competition Braga, Sporting CP and Belenenses.

Wender retired in 2013 at the age of 38, after spending four years in Cyprus with three clubs. He later worked as a coach, also in Portugal.

Playing career
Born in Guiratinga, Mato Grosso with a Lebanese grandfather, Wender started playing professionally with Sport Club do Recife, then moved to Portugal with Associação Naval 1º de Maio after signing in 1999 from modest Esporte Clube Democrata. He spent three additional seasons at S.C. Braga, being a very important attacking player in the Minho team's Primeira Liga and UEFA Cup consolidation.

Wender joined Sporting CP for the 2005–06 campaign. Although he appeared scarcely for the Lisbon side, he scored in both legs of a UEFA Cup tie against Halmstads BK (2–1 away win, 2–3 home loss, subsequent elimination).

In January 2006, Wender was involved in a two-way loan deal as right-back Abel moved to Sporting and he returned for a second Braga spell. The loan was made permanent in 2006–07, and he went on to score eight league goals in an eventual fourth-place finish.

In July 2008, Wender signed with C.F. Os Belenenses' Brazilian contingent on a season-long loan. In the following year, after the capital-based team initially dropped down a tier – later reinstated– Braga sold the 34-year-old to Ermis Aradippou FC in the Cypriot First Division, and he remained in that country several years.

Coaching career
In 2016, Wender was appointed under-17 coach of Palmeiras Futebol Clube, Braga's farm team. In summer 2017, he became the manager of the latter's under-17 squad, being promoted to B-side duties the following 25 January.

Wender left the Estádio Municipal de Braga by mutual consent on 18 February 2019. On 8 June 2021, he signed a contract at Liga Portugal 2 club S.C. Covilhã. He was dismissed on 19 October, with the team 11th in the league and having been eliminated from the Taça de Portugal by amateurs FC Serpa.

References

External links

1975 births
Living people
Brazilian people of Lebanese descent
Sportspeople of Lebanese descent
Sportspeople from Mato Grosso
Brazilian footballers
Association football forwards
Campeonato Brasileiro Série A players
Sport Club do Recife players
Botafogo de Futebol e Regatas players
Ceará Sporting Club players
Esporte Clube Democrata players
Primeira Liga players
Liga Portugal 2 players
Associação Naval 1º de Maio players
S.C. Braga players
Sporting CP footballers
C.F. Os Belenenses players
Cypriot First Division players
Cypriot Second Division players
Ermis Aradippou FC players
Ethnikos Achna FC players
Aris Limassol FC players
Brazilian expatriate footballers
Expatriate footballers in Portugal
Expatriate footballers in Cyprus
Brazilian expatriate sportspeople in Portugal
Brazilian expatriate sportspeople in Cyprus
Brazilian football managers
Liga Portugal 2 managers
S.C. Covilhã managers
Brazilian expatriate football managers
Expatriate football managers in Portugal